Bridgefoot Halt railway station was opened in 1914. The halt was in the settlement of Bridgefoot close to the town of Banff. The line from  opened in 1859 and a temporary terminus opened at Banff on 30 July 1859 and a permanent station opened in 1860. Bridgehouse Halt had a single platform and was opened by the GNoSR. The OS map of 1902 shows a 'Halt' at the site of the 1914 platform without indicating any structure at the site.

The Great North of Scotland Railway (GNoSR) took over the line in 1867 and operated it until grouping in 1923.  Passing into British Railways ownership in 1948, the line was, like the rest of the former GNoSR lines along the Moray coast, considered for closure as part of the Beeching report and closure notices were issued in 1963.  Passenger services were withdrawn in July 1964 and the entire line finally closed to all traffic in 1968.

Station infrastructure
The halt was a simple structure with a small shelter and a short wooden platform, with no provision for goods traffic, closing in 1964 with no significant remains surviving on site. The OS map of 1902 does show a 'Halt' at the site of the 1914 platform without indicating any structure at the site.

See also
List of Great North of Scotland Railway stations

References
Notes

Sources

External links
RailScot - Banff Portsoy and Strathisla Railway

Former Great North of Scotland Railway stations
Railway stations in Great Britain opened in 1914
Railway stations in Great Britain closed in 1964
Disused railway stations in Aberdeenshire
Beeching closures in Scotland
1914 establishments in Scotland
1964 disestablishments in Scotland